Odontobutis interrupta is a species of freshwater sleeper endemic to South Korea.

References

Odontobutis
Fish of East Asia
Endemic fauna of South Korea
Fish described in 1985